Glinnik may refer to the following villages in Poland: 
Glinnik, Lublin Voivodeship (east Poland) 
Glinnik, Tomaszów Mazowiecki County in Łódź Voivodeship (central Poland) 
Glinnik, Gmina Głowno in Łódź Voivodeship (central Poland) 
Glinnik, Gmina Zgierz in Łódź Voivodeship (central Poland) 
Glinnik, Podlaskie Voivodeship (north-east Poland)

See also
Nowy Glinnik, Tomaszów Mazowiecki County, Łódź Voivodeship